Colleen Sheppard  is a professor of law at McGill University Faculty of Law. She was elected a Fellow of the Royal Society of Canada in 2016. Sheppard's scholarship focuses on human rights issues and constitutional law.

Works

References

External links 

 Faculty profile at McGill University Faculty of Law
 

Academic staff of McGill University
Fellows of the Royal Society of Canada
Canadian scholars of constitutional law
Year of birth missing (living people)
Living people
Academic staff of the McGill University Faculty of Law